"Christmas Card from a Hooker in Minneapolis" is a song written and performed by Tom Waits, released on his 1978 album Blue Valentine.

Lyrics
"Christmas Card from a Hooker in Minneapolis" has been described as a "laconic first-person sketch". The song's lyrics narrate a letter written by a prostitute to a man named Charlie. She reveals that she is pregnant, says she has quit alcohol and drugs, describes her current living circumstances (including her stable relationship with a new husband who promises to raise her arriving baby like he would his own son), and outlines the better choices she would make if she "still had all the money we used to spend on dope". At the song's conclusion, the author confesses to Charlie that she has been lying to him; she does not have a husband, is currently serving time in prison, and will be eligible for parole on Valentine's Day.

Personnel
Tom Waits – lead vocal, acoustic piano
Da Willie Gonga (George Duke)  – electric grand piano

Live performances
In the late 1970s, Waits often performed "Christmas Card from a Hooker in Minneapolis" as a medley with "Goin' Out Of My Head," originally recorded by Little Anthony & the Imperials, and "Silent Night," the popular Christmas carol.

For a performance in New York on  November 21, 1985, Waits introduced the song with the following anecdote:

Reception
Denise Sullivan, writing for AllMusic, described "Christmas Card from a Hooker in Minneapolis" as "[o]ne of Tom Waits' most beloved songs from one of his more obscure albums... The song showcases Waits playing a barroom piano melody, weaving words together -- in essence, doing what he does best in one long, bittersweet song."

Cover versions
"Christmas Card from a Hooker in Minneapolis" has been covered by a number of notable bands and artists, including Interzone in 1981, Magnapop in 1995 for Step Right Up: The Songs of Tom Waits, Kacey Jones in 2000, Wolfgang Ambros in 2000, David Broza in 2001, and Aslan in 2005. Neko Case's cover version, featured on the Tom Waits tribute album New Coat of Paint (2002), received critical praise. Denise Sullivan, writing for AllMusic, wrote that "her fragile but tough delivery, accompanied by "church" organ gave the song a whole new kitschy, "hooker with a heart of gold" dimension."

References

Songs written by Tom Waits
1978 songs
Tom Waits songs
Song recordings produced by Bones Howe
Songs about Minnesota
Songs about prostitutes